The Dixon County Courthouse in Ponca, Nebraska was built in 1883–84 and expanded in 1939–1940.  It was listed on the National Register of Historic Places in 1990.

The original courthouse has elements of Italianate architecture.  The addition was designed by Lincoln architect J.F. Reynolds and is in Art Deco style.

It is a contributing property in the NRHP-listed Ponca Historic District.

The construction of the addition was the last salvo in a war between Ponca and Allen, Nebraska about which town would be county seat.

References

Courthouses on the National Register of Historic Places in Nebraska
Italianate architecture in Nebraska
Art Deco architecture in Nebraska
Government buildings completed in 1883
Buildings and structures in Dixon County, Nebraska
County courthouses in Nebraska